Cymindis cincta is a species of ground beetle in the subfamily Harpalinae. It was described by Brulle in 1839.

Location
Cymindis Cincta is recorded to be found in Spain, Canary Islands, Gran Canaria and Mogán.

References

cincta
Beetles described in 1839